Aechmea tomentosa is a plant species in the genus Aechmea. This species is endemic to eastern Brazil, known from the States of Alagoas and Pernambuco.

References

tomentosa
Flora of Brazil
Plants described in 1896